Musawenkosi Twala (born 12 July 2000) is a South African cricketer. He made his first-class debut on 24 October 2019, for Easterns in the 2019–20 CSA 3-Day Provincial Cup. He made his List A debut on 3 April 2022, for Easterns in the 2021–22 CSA One-Day Cup.

References

External links
 

2000 births
Living people
South African cricketers
Easterns cricketers
Place of birth missing (living people)